The notes of the Australian dollar were first issued by the Reserve Bank of Australia on 14 February 1966, when Australia changed to decimal currency and replaced the pound with the dollar. This currency was a lot easier for calculating compared to the previous Australian pound worth 20 shillings or 240 pence.

First series (paper) 
The $1 (10/-), $2 (£1), $10 (£5), and $20 (£10) had exact exchange rates with pounds and were a similar colour to the notes they replaced, but the $5 (£2/10) did not, and was not introduced until May 1967 when the public had become more familiar with decimal currency. The original notes were designed by Gordon Andrews, who rejected traditional Australian clichés in favour of interesting and familiar subjects such as Aboriginal culture, women, the environment, architecture and aeronautics.

Notes issued between 1966 and 1973 bore the title "Commonwealth of Australia". Starting from 1974, the title on the new notes only read "Australia" and the legal tender phrase was also changed from "Legal Tender throughout the Commonwealth of Australia and the territories of the Commonwealth" to "This Australian Note is legal tender throughout Australia and its territories".

The $50 note was introduced in 1973 and the $100 note in 1984, in response to inflation requiring larger denominations for transactions. The $1 note was replaced by a $1 coin in 1984, while the $2 note was replaced by a smaller $2 coin in 1988. Although no longer printed, all previous notes of the Australian dollar are still considered legal tender.

Polymer commemorative $10 note 
In 1988, the Reserve Bank of Australia issued $10 notes in plastic. The polypropylene polymer banknotes were produced by Note Printing Australia, to commemorate the bicentenary of European settlement in Australia. These notes contained a transparent "window" with a diffractive optically variable device (DOVD) image of Captain James Cook as a security feature. Australian notes were the first in the world to use such features. All current Australian notes also contain microprinting for further security.

Second series (polymer) 
There were initial difficulties with the first polymer note issued; the $10 note had problems with the holographic security feature detaching from the note itself. However, the Reserve Bank saw potential in the issue of plastic notes and commenced preparations for an entirely new series made from polymer, commencing with the $5 note in 1992. Today all Australian notes are made of polymer.

In April 1995, the design of the $5 notes was updated to match the rest of the New Banknote Series, with additional slight changes in 1996. In 2001, a special commemorative 'Federation' $5 note was produced, but in 2002, the previous version's production commenced again. From 2002, the design of all notes (except for the $5 note picturing the Queen) was slightly changed to include the names of the people pictured on them under the portraits, and swapping the order of the signatures of officials on the notes.

Third series (polymer) 

On 13 February 2015 the Reserve Bank of Australia announced that the next series of Australia notes would have a tactile feature to help the visually impaired community to tell the value of the note after a successful campaign led by 15-year-old Connor McLeod, who is blind, to introduce the new feature. The notes retain the key aspects of the previous series' design such as the colour, size and people portrayed for ease of recognition and to minimise disruption to businesses.

The new $5 note includes the tactile feature and was issued on 1 September 2016, to coincide with Australia's National Wattle Day, followed by the new $10 banknote on 20 September 2017. The new $50 note was released for circulation on 18 October 2018, followed by the new $20 note on 9 October 2019, and the new $100 was released on the 29 October 2020. The Reserve Bank currently has no plans to release fourth series notes in denominations higher than $100, despite the amount of inflation that has occurred since the $100 note was introduced in 1984.

In May 2019 the Reserve Bank confirmed that the $50 note contained a misspelling of the word "responsibility" on the reverse design, a typo that would be corrected in future printings.

It was announced on 2 February 2023 that the new $5 note would not feature Charles III, but rather an Indigenous design. This is seen as an attempt by the Albanese government to distance Australian currency from Australia's monarchy in the long term. Treasurer Jim Chalmers said, "The monarch will still be on the coins, but the $5 note will say more about our history and our heritage and our country, and I see that as a good thing."

See also 

 Coins of Australia
 List of people who have appeared on Australian currency
 Banknotes of the Canadian dollar
 Banknotes of the New Zealand dollar

References

External links 

 Australian banknotes price guide and values coinsandaustralia.com
 Australian Decimal Banknotes australianstamp.com
 The Money Tracker site allows users to track Australian banknotes as they circulate around Australia.
 The Reserve Bank of Australia has a full timeline  of Australian banknotes.